Denise Launay (7 October 1906 – 13 March 1993) was a 20th-century French organist and musicologist.

Biography 

Launay studied the history of music with André Pirro and Paul-Marie Masson at the Sorbonne, and the organ with André Marchal and Gaston Litaize. From 1939, she was a curator at the Bibliothèque Nationale de France. She was the organist at the Notre-Dame-de-Lorette church in Paris during 35 ans.

Works

Publications 
1965: Essai d’un commentaire de Titelouze par lui-même
1974: Anthologie du psaume français polyphonique (1610–1663), tome 1 (n°1 to 14), Éditions ouvrières, 35 p.
1993: La musique religieuse en France du Concile de Trente à 1804, Société française de musicologie et Éditions Klincksieck, Paris, 583 p.

References

External links 
 Denise Launay on Symétrie
 Discography on Discogs
 Denise Launay on Liturgia
 Les paraphrases bibliques aux XVIe et XVIIe siècles

French classical organists
Women organists
20th-century French musicologists
1906 births
Musicians from Paris
1993 deaths
20th-century organists
20th-century French women musicians
20th-century classical musicians
French women curators